Algan (also Romanized as Algān; also known as Alkān) is a village in Qahan Rural District, Khalajastan District, Qom County, Qom Province, Iran. At the 2006 census, its population was 50, in 21 families.

References 

Populated places in Qom Province